Bouasone Bouphavanh (Lao: ບົວສອນ ບູບຜາວັນ; born 3 June 1954) is a Laotian politician who was Prime Minister of Laos from 2006 to 2010. He was officially appointed to the office by the National Assembly of Laos on 8 June 2006, during a major government reshuffle. He replaced Bounnhang Vorachith who became vice president. Bouasone had previously served as first deputy prime minister since October 3, 2003. Before that, he was third deputy prime minister and was president of the State Planning Committee. He ranks seventh in the Politburo. He was replaced as Prime Minister on 23 December 2010 by Thongsing Thammavong. Now, Bouasone Bouphavanh currently serves as head of the Lao Party Central Committee's Commission for Economic Development Strategy Research.

Career
He was educated at a primary school and secondary school in Salavan Province and Champasak Province from 1962 to 1974 and later at the Communist Party Institute in Moscow in the Soviet Union from 1985 to 1990.

In 1975, shortly before the fall of Vientiane to the Pathet Lao, he was a student activist who played a key role in protests against the previous regime. He is considered a protégé of former party leader Khamtai Siphandon. He was accepted into the party on 9 April 1980.

He was elected to the LPRP Central Committee at the 6th National Congress and retained a seat on the body until the 9th National Congress. At the 7th National Congress he was elected to the LPRP Politburo, and he was reelected at the 8th National Congress.

References

Specific

Bibliography
Books:
 

1954 births
Members of the 6th Central Committee of the Lao People's Revolutionary Party
Members of the 7th Central Committee of the Lao People's Revolutionary Party
Members of the 8th Central Committee of the Lao People's Revolutionary Party
Members of the 7th Politburo of the Lao People's Revolutionary Party
Members of the 8th Politburo of the Lao People's Revolutionary Party
Lao People's Revolutionary Party politicians
Living people
Members of the National Assembly of Laos
Deputy Prime Ministers of Laos
Prime Ministers of Laos
People from Salavan province